José Antonio Ardanza Garro (born 10 June 1941) is a former Spanish politician that became the second elected Lehendakari (President of the Basque Autonomous Community, Spain after the approval of the Statute of Autonomy. He was in office between 1985 and 1999.

Politics
In 1985, the Basque Parliament chose Ardanza as its new president. Spanning several legislatures, Ardanza's presidency continued until 1999. He continued the work on self-government begun by his predecessor, concentrating particularly on social and economic development, modernizing the region, and claiming greater levels of self-government. Much of Ardanza's time and effort was also aimed at delivering peace to the region and to denouncing the terrorism of ETA. One achievement was the Pact of Ajuria Enea, subscribed to by virtually all the political parties in the region and designed to create a normal political environment in the Basque Country by eradicating violence. The modernization of the Basque Country that occurred under Ardanza's mandate facilitated further economic and social development that gave Basque society levels of wealth and welfare comparable to those of numerous other Western European regions.

See also
Basque tax holidays

References

1941 births
Living people
Presidents of the Basque Government
Basque Nationalist Party politicians
Basque history
People from Durangaldea
Members of the 3rd Basque Parliament
Members of the 4th Basque Parliament
Mayors of places in the Basque Country
Members of the 5th Basque Parliament
University of Deusto alumni